Firth Park Academy is a coeducational secondary school with academy status, located in the Shiregreen area of Sheffield, England.

It is partnered with Longley Park Sixth Form, HBH Academy Trust, Beck Primary School, Hucklow Primary  School and others.

History
The school began as Firth Park Secondary School in 1920, becoming Firth Park Grammar School in 1937. This became the comprehensive Firth Park School in 1969. Old pupils of the school are known as Old Firparnians. In 2004, the Longley Park Sixth Form College was opened on the site of Firth Park Grammar School. The school gained specialist status as an Arts College and was renamed Firth Park Community Arts College. The school converted to academy status on 1 August 2013 and was renamed Firth Park Academy. The school is now sponsored by the Academies Enterprise Trust.

Academic performance
Currently, the school achieves average GCSEs grades;  a large number of students entering the school have average attainment level of around 85%. The number of students achieving five or more A*-C GCSEs has been increasing for the past several years. The sixth form college for Firth Park Academy is Longley Park Sixth Form.

Television appearance 
From 2016 to 2021, Firth Park Academy appeared in the CBBC show, Our School. This showed the journey of new Year 7's joining Firth Park Academy.

Notable former pupils

 Stuart Ford, goalkeeper
 Richard Hawley, musician with the Longpigs
 Mark Rhodes, footballer with Rotherham United

Firth Park Grammar School
 Robert Battersby CBE, Conservative MEP from 1979–89 for Humberside
 Gerald Brooke, arrested for smuggling anti-Soviet leaflets in USSR in 1965
 Howard Johnson, footballer
 Gordon Linacre CBE AFC DFM, Chairman from 1983–90 of Yorkshire Post Newspapers 
 Lincoln Ralphs, Chief Education Officer from 1950–74 of Norfolk 
 Roy Shaw, Secretary General from 1975–83 of the Arts Council of Great Britain
 Paul Truswell, Labour MP from 1997–2010 for Pudsey

Firth Park Secondary School
 John Bridge, the first person to be awarded a bar to the George Medal was a teacher at the school before and after the Second World War
 Gordon Hobson, footballer

References

External links
 School website
 Website of former Firth Park Grammar School & Comprehensive School pupils

Educational institutions established in 1920
Secondary schools in Sheffield
1920 establishments in England
Academies in Sheffield
Academies Enterprise Trust